The 2nd constituency of the Orne (French: Deuxième circonscription de l'Orne) is a French legislative constituency in the Orne département. Like the other 576 French constituencies, it elects one MP using a two round electoral system.

Description

The 2nd Constituency of the Orne covers the eastern portion of the department including the town of L'Aigle.

Since 1988 the seat has always returned conservative or centre right deputies to the National Assembly including the first woman to represent the seat Véronique Louwagie.

Assembly Members

Election results

2022

 
 
 
 
 
 
 
 
|-
| colspan="8" bgcolor="#E9E9E9"|
|-

2017

 
 
 
 
 
 
 
|-
| colspan="8" bgcolor="#E9E9E9"|
|-

2012

References

2